Auto Atlantic is an Atlantic Canada-based automotive industry magazine.

History and profile
Auto Atlantic magazine is based in Halifax, Nova Scotia, Canada. Published six times per year, and distributed to 8000 subscribers mainly in the four Atlantic provinces (with additional distribution to the rest of Canada and the United States. Auto Atlantic is owned and published by Alfers Advertising and Publishing Inc. The company is headed by Robert Alfers, who founded the magazine in 2002.

The magazine's editorial serves all the segments of the automotive industries audience in Atlantic Canada - from installers to jobbers, garages, retailers, auto recyclers, car and truck dealers, etc. Contributing writers are experienced and very well respected in their field. Auto Atlantic publishes a wide variety of subjects that cover popular interests from local, regional, national and international stages. However the main focus of the publication has always been to inform, and assist, the business owner, manager or mechanic.

See also
Media in Canada

References

External links
Official Website

2002 establishments in Nova Scotia
Automobile magazines
Bi-monthly magazines published in Canada
Magazines established in 2002
Magazines published in Nova Scotia
Trade magazines published in Canada